Reverchon Industries is a developer, designer and manufacturer of amusement park attractions that were sold all over the world. 
Its production unit is still set in the French city of Samois-sur-Seine, near Fontainebleau.

History

1929: Gaston Reverchon, a young coach builder, created his own workshop in the suburbs of Paris. The rides business began there when Gaston Reverchon thought to adapt the coachwork he used on real cars to bumper cars. At the time, bumper cars were nothing more than a steering wheel and a seat attached to a wooden board on wheels. The first Reverchon bumper-car with its metallic color and design inspired by the American cars of that period went on to the market and was an instant success.
1937: It occurred to Gaston Reverchon to not only make parts for bumper-car rides but the whole ride itself and that year, on the dawn of the second world war, Télécombat, a ride featuring small military airplanes, was born.
1956: After progress had been halted by the war, Reverchon began to provide attractions for distraction-thirsty Europeans. Joined by his sons Michel and Christian, working respectively as designer and technician ("Gaston Reverchon" became "Gaston Reverchon and Sons"), he began a second diversification, designing and producing a full range of complete rides. In 1956, they were the first to develop polyester as part of the bumper cars' coachwork.
1950–1971: These two decades marked a golden age for Reverchon, throughout which the company created new rides and improved old ones. The production unit was relocated to Samois-sur-Seine, where 2,000 cars and 50 rides were produced every year and a new model designed every 5 years. In 1971, 270 workers were working in the company.
1973: 1973 proved to be a big year for Reverchon Industries, when Christian Reverchon presented his two latest attractions in Chicago: Himalaya and Paratrooper. Here, the company understood its strength and weaknesses: the public found the rides very fun and the aesthetic pleasing but the rides took very long to set up (3 days for 3 people). It also revealed Reverchon Industries' desire to expand beyond Europe.
1976: In 1976, Reverchon made its first flume ride at Bagatelle Park, in Berck France.
1978: Having learned a lesson from 1973, Reverchon launched a bumper car system to be set up using hydraulics. Now, rather than requiring two days for six people, the owner could do the work all on his or her own.
1990: The first Reverchon roller coaster is installed at Le Pal in France.
1997: The first Crazy Mouse coaster opens at Dinosaur Beach in Wildwood, New Jersey, U.S.
2003: During the 2003 IAAPA Expo, Alberto Zamperla and Gilles Reverchon announced Zamperla would manufacture and sell Reverchon amusement rides worldwide under a license agreement. The first coaster built under this arrangement is installed in 2004 at Six Flags Great America.
2005: The Zamperla and Reverchon agreement is dissolved, however and since this time Zamperla continued to build Spinning Coaster with the Reverchon designs. It is virtually identical to the Reverchon model except for the use of individual restraints mounted to the floor of the vehicle – the Reverchon passenger restraints pull down from overhead.

List of roller coasters

As of 2023, Reverchon Industries has built more than 80 roller coasters around the world.

References

Related News
 Firm guilty over park ride death, BBC

Amusement ride manufacturers
Manufacturing companies of France
Companies based in Île-de-France
Seine-et-Marne